Germán Emmanuel Gaitán (born 31 July 1995) is an Argentine professional footballer who plays as an attacking midfielder.

Career
After signing a professional contract with Primera División side Belgrano in November 2015, Gaitán made his debut for the club on 24 May 2016 in a 1–0 win against Rosario Central. In the following August, Gaitán appeared in continental competition for the first time after making his bow in the 2016 Copa Sudamericana versus Estudiantes. On 26 January 2018, Gaitán was signed on loan by Colegiales of Primera B Metropolitana. He scored his first career goal on 18 March against Sacachispas. Gaitán joined Colegiales permanently in August 2018. After one season, Gaitán headed to Chaco For Ever of Torneo Federal A.

Career statistics
.

References

External links

1995 births
Living people
Footballers from Córdoba, Argentina
Argentine footballers
Association football midfielders
Argentine Primera División players
Primera B Metropolitana players
Torneo Federal A players
Club Atlético Belgrano footballers
Club Atlético Colegiales (Argentina) players
Chaco For Ever footballers